Mukayevo (Mökäy) is a rural locality (a village) in Novokiyeshkinsky Selsoviet, Karmaskalinsky District, Bashkortostan, Russia. The population was 259 as of 2010. There are 11 streets.

Geography 
Mukayevo is located 20 km southeast of Karmaskaly (the district's administrative centre) by road. Kullyarovo is the nearest rural locality.

References 

Rural localities in Karmaskalinsky District